Marty Murray (born February 16, 1975) is a Canadian former professional ice hockey centre who played eight seasons in the National Hockey League (NHL) for the Calgary Flames, Philadelphia Flyers, Carolina Hurricanes and Los Angeles Kings. He is currently the general manager of the Western Hockey League's Brandon Wheat Kings, and was formerly the general manager and head coach of the Sioux Falls Stampede.

Playing career
Murray was drafted 96th overall by the Calgary Flames in the 1993 NHL Entry Draft from the Brandon Wheat Kings and joined the Flames organization in 1995.  He spent three seasons dividing his time between the Calgary Flames and the Saint John Flames in the AHL, playing 19 NHL games.  Murray then spent two seasons playing in Europe, in 1998 he played in the Austrian Hockey League for VSV EC and then moved to Germany's Deutsche Eishockey Liga for the Kölner Haie.  He then returned to Calgary in 2000, but played only seven games as he spent most of the season with Saint John.

Murray signed with the Philadelphia Flyers in 2001 where he received a lot more ice time spending almost two full seasons with the team.  He was traded to the Carolina Hurricanes in 2003, spending one season with the team.  After the NHL lockout, Murray returned to Germany, spending one season with the Hannover Scorpions. Murray then re-signed with Philadelphia but remained with their AHL affiliate the Philadelphia Phantoms and was eventually claimed off waivers by the Los Angeles Kings, splitting his spell between LA and the Manchester Monarchs. Murray then signed for Swiss Nationalliga A side HC Lugano in 2007.  The following year he rejoined the Monarchs for a single season prior to signing a contract with the Manitoba Moose the year after that.

Transactions
Selected by the Calgary Flames in the 4th round 96th overall during the 1993 NHL Entry Draft.
Signed as a free agent by the Philadelphia Flyers, July 9, 2001.
Traded to the Carolina Hurricanes by Philadelphia for a 2004 6th round draft pick (Frederik Cabana), June 22, 2003.
Signed as a free agent by the Philadelphia Flyers, June 15, 2006.
Claimed off recall waivers by the Los Angeles Kings on November 11, 2006.
Signed to a one-year contract with the Manchester Monarchs on August 11, 2008.
Signed as a free agent by the Manitoba Moose on August 17, 2009.
Loaned to the Milwaukee Admirals by Manitoba in return for the loan of Peter Olvecky, on March 10, 2010.

Awards
Canadian Major Junior Second All-Star Team (1994)
WHL East First All-Star Team (1994, 1995)
Best Forward - World Junior Championships (1995)
World Junior Championships First All-Star Team (1995)
AHL Canadian All-Star team (1996)
AHL All-Star Rookie of the Game (1996)

Career statistics

Regular season and playoffs

International

References

External links
 

1975 births
Brandon Wheat Kings players
Calgary Flames draft picks
Calgary Flames players
Canadian ice hockey centres
Carolina Hurricanes players
EC VSV players
Hannover Scorpions players
HC Lugano players
Ice hockey people from Manitoba
Kölner Haie players
Living people
Los Angeles Kings players
Manchester Monarchs (AHL) players
Manitoba Moose players
Milwaukee Admirals players
People from Deloraine, Manitoba
Philadelphia Flyers players
Philadelphia Phantoms players
Saint John Flames players
Canadian expatriate ice hockey players in Austria
Canadian expatriate ice hockey players in Germany
Canadian expatriate ice hockey players in Switzerland